David East is a visual artist and the Chair of Ceramics at the Maryland Institute College of Art. He has received an Individual Artist Award from the Maryland State Arts Council, a Lighton International Artists Exchange Program Grant, and was an artist-in-residence at the European Ceramic Work Centre in The Netherlands.   His work is in many collections including the Faenza International Ceramic Museum in Faenza, Italy.

References

External links
 David East at The Clay Studio
 David East on Artaxis
 "Journey Beyond The Artist's Studio: David East" on The Studio Chronicle

20th-century American artists
21st-century American artists
American ceramists
Year of birth missing (living people)
Living people
21st-century ceramists